The South Egyptian Conference (SEC) is a small school conference in southern Illinois.

SEC schools compete in baseball, softball, basketball, both boys and girls, and girls' volleyball. All schools in the SEC are a part of and participate in IHSA sporting events.

Member Schools

 Agape Christian is an IHSA approved member only and not IHSA post season eligible.

Former Members

References

External links
 Illinois High School Association, Official Site

High school sports conferences and leagues in the United States
Illinois high school sports conferences
High school sports in Illinois